Jan Hendrik van Kinsbergen, Count of Doggerbank (1 May 1735 – 24 May 1819), was a Dutch naval officer. Having had a good scientific education, Van Kinsbergen was a proponent of fleet modernization and wrote many books about naval organization, discipline and tactics.

In 1773, he twice defeated an Ottoman fleet while in Russian service. Returning to the Dutch Republic in 1775, he became a Dutch naval hero in 1781, fighting the Royal Navy, and gradually attained the position of commander-in-chief as a lieutenant-admiral. When France conquered the Republic in 1795 he was fired by the new revolutionary regime and prevented from becoming Danish commander-in-chief, but the Kingdom of Holland reinstated him in 1806, in the rank of fleet marshal, and made him a count. He was again degraded by the French Empire in 1810; after the liberation the United Kingdom of the Netherlands in 1814 honoured him with his old rank of lieutenant-admiral.

Van Kinsbergen, in his later life a very wealthy man, was also noted for his philanthropy, supporting poor relief, naval education, the arts and the sciences.

Life

Early career

Van Kinsbergen was born in Doesburg as the eldest son of the non-commissioned officer Johann Henrich van Kinsbergen, who had been born in Neunkirchen, Germany, in 1706, started his military career in Austrian service, and originally spelled his family name as "Ginsberg".  When he was six, he moved with his parents in 1741 to Elburg.  Three years later he left with his father for the Southern Netherlands and at the age of nine enlisted as a soldier of the Dutch field army during the War of the Austrian Succession, returning in 1748. Reading the biography of Gerard Brandt about the life of Admiral Michiel de Ruyter, he decided to become a naval hero as well and went to the naval academy of Groningen, where he was trained as an engineer between 1751 and 1755.  In 1756, he became a midshipman on the Weststellingerwerf and on 16 March 1758 a lieutenant, in the Admiralty of Amsterdam, on the Maarssen.

Van Kinsbergen had three younger brothers; two enlisted in the army of Prussia; the youngest, Jan Hermanus, worked for the Dutch East India Company (VOC), but in 1770 was cashiered as a captain, when his ship the Leimuiden got stuck on the rocks of the Cape Verde island Boa Vista and he brought himself and a chosen few off the wreck in safety via a sloop, leaving behind the rest of the crew. Jan Hermanus would be later appointed a naval captain through the influence of Jan Hendrik, embarrassing the latter by becoming involved in a few serious accidents. Jan Hendrik served on the Amazone in 1761; from 13 October 1763 he commanded the frigate Swieten.

Russian service
In the late 1760s, due to severe financial difficulties, few Dutch ships were active and Van Kinsbergen used his free time to write a large series of publications about naval modernisation. He is seen as a typical example of the new generation of Dutch naval officers of the era who longer owed their position to either a merchant fleet career or a noble background but to a thorough scientific education.

In 1769, Van Kinsbergen despaired of ever being promoted and obtained leave to enter the service of the VOC and depart for the Dutch Indies for four years. However, in the previous years he had already established a minor international reputation as a naval thinker, enthusiastically corresponding with many influential foreign contacts. He was informed by Prince Henry of Prussia that due to the Russo-Turkish War (1768–1774) the Russian navy was in search of naval experts. Henry immediately could obtain him a position there. On 15 August 1770, Van Kinsbergen got permission from the Dutch admiral-general, stadholder William V, Prince of Orange, to depart for Russia.  However, William V would not free him completely from his obligations. Van Kinsbergen was promised that one year later, on 15 August 1771, he would in his absence be appointed captain. In exchange again three years after that date he would return to the fatherland should it have need of his services and this cycle of temporary appointments would be repeated every three years.

In the summer of 1771, Jan Hendrik travelled via Berlin, where he visited Prince Henry, to Saint Petersburg where he on 29 September was appointed acting captain in the Imperial Russian Navy; on 2 October he was promoted to captain second class. He immediately left for the Black Sea; on arrival he was charged with commanding a troop of cossacks and fought, meanwhile learning Russian, on land during the winter campaign. In a fight he was shot through the knee and saved from under a heap of corpses by a cossack, whom he would later get an appointment at the Amsterdam naval wharf.

From 9 February 1772 at Iaşi he repaired river vessels captured from the Turkish Danube fleet. On 12 June he got his first naval command in Russian service, bringing dispatches on a galiot to Azov. From 13 November he brought dispatches from the southern army to Saint Petersburg. He was on that occasion introduced to the empress and made a favourable impression on her with his enthusiastic plans for the Black Sea fleet. Accordingly, on 23 April 1773 he became flotilla-commander in the Black Sea. His force was rather insignificant consisting of just two ketches of twelve cannon each and two yachts. Van Kinsbergen decided nevertheless that the moment had arrived to make a name for himself and acted as aggressively as his limited powers allowed. He entered the Sea of Marmara through the Bosporus, charted it as the first Western European ever, then entered the Dardanelles and finally returned to the Black Sea after duelling with a coastal fortress of Istanbul.

Twice that year he defeated a Turkish fleet and won the title 'Hero of the Black Sea'.  On 23 June, he encountered a Turkish flotilla of three frigates of 52 cannon and a ship-of-the-line of 75 and despite the disparity in firepower at once attacked it and wiped it out, the first major "Christian" naval victory in the Black Sea in four centuries. His superiors were very pleased and gave him permission to raid Sinope, but this was soon changed into a mission to intercept a transport fleet headed for the Crimea. In the morning of 2 September he spotted the enemy fleet off Novorossiysk but at the same time a messenger brought him the order to abandon the attack in view of the force imbalance: Van Kinsbergen's original two ketches had only been reinforced by a single frigate of 32 cannon and a fireship, while the Turkish fleet numbered four ships-of-the-line, seven frigates and six transports with five thousand men infantry. Determined to give battle anyway, van Kinsbergen declared in front of his officers that such an order could not possibly be authentic, arrested the messenger and pursued the attack. Conforming to the standard tactics of the day, the Turkish fleet sailed in a formal line-of-battle. Van Kinsbergen realized that doing likewise would only result in the quick annihilation of his flotilla and therefore applied a modern concentration of forces: using the weather gauge he frontally attacked the leading Turkish vessel, causing the following Turkish ships to break formation. During the ensuing melee the Turkish fleet got so damaged and confused that it abandoned the landing attempt and withdrew. Van Kinsbergen's insubordination was soon forgiven and he was on 22 September rewarded with the Order of St. George, be it only in the fourth degree, which rather disappointed him.

After the war, Van Kinsbergen feared he would not be promoted and in November 1774 obtained a temporary discharge from Russian service. Although Catherine the Great would gladly have kept him on in the Russian navy, promoted him to captain first class and knight in the third degree (from 1776 even second degree) he asked to be accepted into Dutch service in May 1775, from August travelled via Saint Petersburg and Berlin to the Republic, obtained a final honourable discharge from Russian service in December, and early 1776 was back in the service of the Dutch.

Return to the Dutch Republic
In 1776 Van Kinsbergen was readmitted into the Admiralty of Amsterdam as a full captain, which raised quite a few eyebrows as the deal with stadtholder William had been kept a secret. In this period tensions between the United Kingdom and the Dutch Republic, caused by the American Revolution, led to Dutch efforts to build up the fleet and therefore to increased career opportunities for Dutch officers. From 17 May 1776 Van Kinsbergen was sent on an international expedition, as captain of the Amphitrite, against Morocco to enforce a treaty upon Mohammed ben Abdallah to limit the privateering activities of the Barbary corsairs; on 27 June he was as an envoy present at the signing of the treaty at Salé, returning to the Republic in October. In 1778 he was captain of the frigate Argo; in October he went again to Salé to deliver the treaty document ratified by the States-General of the Netherlands. After returning he and his Argo were part of the convoy temporarily detained by a superior British fleet on 31 December 1779 in search of contraband for France, the Affair of Fielding and Bylandt.

The Dutch populace was outraged by this event, refusing to further cooperate with measures directed at blockading America and war with Britain became inevitable, even though the Dutch were ill-prepared for it. In 1780 Van Kinbergen became a member of a commission that should strengthen the Dutch coastal defences. Meanwhile, he had published a great number of articles and booklets regarding naval reorganisation; in 1780 his Sailor's Compendium appeared, written with cooperation of the religious author Joannes Florentius Martinet and aimed at improving discipline. Officers should themselves be an exemplary role model and abstain from gambling, boozing, whoring and swearing — except in the latter case when giving orders, as in Van Kinsbergen's experience they tended to be followed much better if containing a few curses.

Late Republican navy
Early 1781, the British started a series of surprise attacks on Dutch ships and colonies and thereby the Fourth Anglo-Dutch War. The inferior Dutch home fleet mostly avoided a direct confrontation but Van Kinsbergen, on 12 February having been appointed temporary rear-admiral, played an important role in the only major naval fight of the war, the Battle of Dogger Bank, as flotilla commander, second in command to Rear-Admiral Johan Zoutman. Van Kinsbergen on the Admiraal-Generaal escorted a merchant convoy when he by accident encountered a British squadron superior in firepower and managed to ensure the survival of the convoy. The Dutch were jubilant and Van Kinsbergen acquired the status of naval hero.

He was honoured by stadholder William V by being awarded a special Dogger Bank Medal, as the Dutch Republic had no honorary military orders. William was in need of a popular figurehead to bolster his regime and on 14 August 1781 appointed Van Kinsbergen as his adjutant-general and used him as his permanent naval advisor. This way van Kinsbergen soon became the de facto supreme naval commander and also gained a wider political influence, having regular talks with the Orangist leaders on how best to counter the Patriots. On 10 May 1782 he also became a major, commanding a newly raised marine unit. The same year he published general instructions regarding the naval service and a Fundamentals of Naval Tactics, that would be translated into Russian in 1792. In October he commanded a squadron headed for Norway to escort a VOC return fleet; in his absence he was on 10 October appointed a member of the new Secret Council for Naval Affairs.

In 1783, wearied by the endless criticism of the Dutch naval policy, he considered to return to Russian service but was persuaded by the stadtholder to remain. In 1784 and 1785 he went to the Mediterranean on the Jupiter, partly to deter a possible attack from Venice. At Toulon he received the news that an investigating commission had concluded that he was to blame for the so-called "Brest affair", the failure of the attempt in the summer of 1782 to form a combined Spanish-French-Dutch fleet in the English Channel. In reaction he sent his resignation to William, but again the stadtholder managed to change his admiral's mind. In February 1786 he returned with part of his squadron. On 23 July 1786 he married for the first time, with Hester Hooft, the very wealthy daughter of an Amsterdam burgomaster and widow of schepen George Clifford IV.

In 1787 the relationship with the stadtholder became strained when the latter used a Prussian military intervention to repress the Patriots. Van Kinsbergen's house in Amsterdam was even searched by soldiers for evidence of secret dealings with William's enemies, though nothing more incriminating was found than some sabres and pistols. At that time Van Kinsbergen had already left the Republic however: he was on a honeymoon in Germany, being received in Vienna by Joseph II, Holy Roman Emperor. Again, envoys of Catharina tried to make him re-enter Russian service, offering him the rank of vice-admiral and the command of the Black Sea fleet, but after some consideration he refused in March 1788, even though the stadtholder had consented to a change of service in February. On 8 April 1789 he also refused to become Danish commander-in-chief; on 16 December he was appointed Dutch vice-admiral.

In 1790 he commanded an auxiliary squadron, joining the English fleet for a possible conflict with Spain. In 1791 and 1792, revolutionary France attacked the Republic and Van Kinsbergen stayed on land, writing a number of publications. On 3 March 1793, he became admiral-commander-in-chief of the Hollandic and Zealandic fleet and commander of the naval-artillery corps, in the summer beating off a French invasion attempt to cross the Hollands Diep. On 11 August 1793 he was appointed lieutenant-admiral. In 1794 the allied Rhine defences collapsed and the French could in early 1795 march unopposed over the frozen Dutch Water Line, bringing the Patriots to power.

In disgrace with the Batavian Republic
On 17 January 1795 at Scheveningen he took leave from the departing stadtholder, who fled for England, never to return. In the absence of the admiral-general Van Kinbergen was now supreme commander; England apparently being the new enemy he took measures to prevent Dutch ships and ports falling into English hands. On 29 January and again on 9 February he bade the States-General to be relieved from his duty. However, these themselves were at this moment being replaced by a new revolutionary regime, instated by the French: The Batavian Republic. On 24 February he was arrested on orders of the Provisional Representatives of the province of Holland, revolutionaries who had appointed themselves as a provisional government.

Soon he was again released, only to be cashiered together with the entire naval officer corps on 27 February. Although some urged him to ask the new regime to be reinstated, Van Kinsbergen, confused and depressed, simply did not bother. On 26 April his wife died and in June he accepted a Danish offer to become vice-admiral and commander-in-chief. However, the revolutionary regime refused to give him permission to leave the country and in 1796 pressured Denmark to withdraw his appointment, though he nominally stayed in Danish service until 1806.

In 1796 Van Kinsbergen returned to the old house of his deceased parents in Elburg, dedicating his life to philanthropy. He created a naval academy in Elburg and an orphanage in Apeldoorn; in 1799 for his health he moved to an estate near the latter town, Welgelegen, a former property of a deceased younger brother. Gradually the Batavian Republic, in need of popular men to legitimise its power, began to make overtures to Van Kinsbergen: in 1797 it was suggested he become supreme commander; in 1801 even a formal offer was made. This failed however because he demanded that all officers be reinstated. Early 1806 Grand Pensionary Rutger Jan Schimmelpenninck, a man well acquainted to him, made a personal and emotional appeal, but the admiral again refused.

Kingdom of Holland
However, in the summer of 1806, on orders of Emperor Napoleon I the Kingdom of Holland was created and his brother, the new King Louis Bonaparte, on 16 July appointed Van Kinsbergen member of the Dutch Council of State and First Chamberlain — and these were only the first of a long list of honours bestowed on the old admiral: e.g. on 26 December he was made marshal, on 15 May 1808 Marshal of the Hollandic Naval Forces and on 4 February 1810, when on French orders all Dutch marshals had to be degraded, he was appointed full admiral. On 4 May 1810 he was made Count of the Dogger Bank. On 11 October 1808 Alexander I of Russia had awarded him the star of the Order of St. Andrew which entailed the Order of St. Alexander Nevsky, the Order of the White Eagle, the Order of St. Anne, first degree, and the Order of St. Stanislaus.

In 1810 though, the Kingdom of Holland was annexed by the French Empire and Van Kinsbergen degraded to a French vice-admiral. However, on 18 December 1810 he was made a French count and on 2 January 1811 appointed French senator. Van Kinsbergen wrote to Napoleon on 11 January that he was too old to move to Paris — knowing quite well the emperor had not intended him to — and asked that his salary might be redirected to the navy, causing an annoyed Napoleon to react: "Does this proud Holland sailor think he can use me to dole out his alms?".
Meanwhile, Van Kinsbergen continued his charitable works: e.g. in 1811 he donated a fire engine to the municipality of Elburg.

Continued appreciation from the Kingdom of the Netherlands
Late 1813 cossacks liberated the territory of the Northern Netherlands; Van Kinsbergen used his knowledge of Russian to negotiate an armistice between the French forces occupying Het Loo and the Russian troops, preventing this royal palace from being plundered. Also, he raised two regiments of Dutch volunteers to besiege the French garrison holding out in Deventer. On 28 March 1814 he was appointed one of the six hundred electors to approve the new Dutch Constitution. On 12 June 1814, he was appointed by the new sovereign prince, William VI of Orange, titular lieutenant-admiral and on 11 July a full lieutenant-admiral: in the new United Kingdom of the Netherlands this was to be a purely honorary rank, bestowed for great merit, in the case of Van Kinsbergen for his "excellent merits and constant Patriotism". In 1815 he became, on 8 July, Knight Grand Cross of the Order of William.

The same year he offered a prize of seven hundred guilder for the best commemorative volume about the events of 1813, won by Johannes van der Palm. Hendrik Tollens won Van Kinsbergen's prize of five hundred guilder for a Dutch national anthem, with "Wien Neêrlands Bloed".  In 1817 he also donated marble busts of Christiaan Huygens, Pieter Corneliszoon Hooft, Hugo de Groot, Herman Boerhaave and Peter Paul Rubens to the Royal Netherlands Academy of Arts and Sciences in the Trippenhuis, works by Paulus Joseph Gabriël; another bust by the same, of De Ruyter, was given to the Amsterdam Naval Academy, festively carried by a fleet of boats through the canals. The wealthy merchant Jan Kluppel was so touched by the sight that he ordered also a bust of the modest Van Kinsbergen himself to be sculpted by Gabriël, to be placed below that of De Ruyter.

On 20 November 1816 van Kinsbergen received the royal writ by the new King William I of the Netherlands that he was promoted to jonkheer.  He died three years later shortly after his 84th birthday at Apeldoorn, from a chronic lung disease, where he was buried on 27 May. In 1821 a marble grave monument was finished by Gabriël in the Nieuwe Kerk in Amsterdam, but this is a cenotaph.

Honours and awards
 Member of the Chapter of the Royal Order of Merit (16 December 1806)
 Knight Grand Cross of the Military William Order (8 July 1815)
 Grand Cross of the Royal Order of Holland (1807)
 Duke of Dogger Bank (4 May 1810)
 Member of the Royal Netherlands Academy of Arts and Sciences (4 May 1808)
 Grand Cross of the Order of St. Andrew (11 October 1808)
 Order of St. Alexander Nevsky
 Order of St. Anne, 1st class
 Order of the White Eagle
 Order of St. Stanislaus
 Order of St. George, 4th class (1773) and 3rd class (1775)
 Hero of the Black Sea

Namesakes
The Dutch Navy has named a training vessel (launched in 2000) after him, as well as a 1980s  and an artillery-instruction ship that served from 1939 until 1952.  A street has been named after him in every town to which he was related:  Amsterdam, Apeldoorn, Elburg and The Hague.

References

Literature 
 R. B. Prud'homme van Reine: Jan Hendrik van Kinsbergen 1735-1819. Admiraal en Filantroop.  De Bataafsche Leeuw, Amsterdam, 1990,  (Dutch)
 M. C. van Hall: Het Leven en Karakter van den Admiraal Jan Hendrik van Kinsbergen. Johannes Müller, Amsterdam, 1841 (Dutch)

1735 births
1819 deaths
People from Doesburg
Dutch admirals in Russian service
Royal Netherlands Navy personnel
Royal Netherlands Navy admirals
18th-century military personnel from the Russian Empire
People of the Patriottentijd
Dutch nobility
Recipients of the Order of St. George of the Third Degree
Recipients of the Order of St. Anna, 1st class
Recipients of the Order of Saint Stanislaus (Congress Poland)
Knights Grand Cross of the Military Order of William
Members of the Royal Netherlands Academy of Arts and Sciences
Dutch philanthropists
Dutch military commanders of the Napoleonic Wars
Dutch military personnel of the French Revolutionary Wars
People of the Kingdom of Holland
18th-century Dutch military personnel